A moffle is a Japanese dish consisting of mochi rice cake cooked in a waffle iron, which creates a waffle. A typical cooked moffle has a crunchy exterior with a thin interior layer of glutinous mochi. When prepared as a dessert, it is typically served with various condiments. It is also prepared as a snack food using ingredients such as ham and cheese or cod roe.

Sanyei Company claims to have invented the moffle, receiving a trademark for the product in 2000. Sanyei mass-produces moffle makers for consumer and commercial use. Some restaurants use flavored mochi to prepare the moffle.

See also
 List of rice dishes
 Japanese cuisine

References

External links
 In Japan, Waffle + Mochi = Moffle. Inventor Spot.

Waffles
Rice dishes
Japanese cuisine